The 2005–06 CEV Women's Champions League  was the highest level of European club volleyball in the 2005–06 season.

Group stage

Pool A

|}

Pool B

|}

Play-off 6
1st leg  14–15 February 2006
2nd leg 21–23 February 2006

Final four
venue: Cannes, France
dates: 18–19 March 2006

Semi-finals

|}

Third place match

|}

Final

|}

Final standing

Awards
 MVP:  Victoria Ravva, RC Cannes
 Best Scorer:  Neslihan Darnel,  Vakıfbank Günes Istanbul
 Best Spiker:   Mirka Francia,  Sirio Perugia
 Best Server:   Angelina Grün,    Foppapedretti Bergamo
 Best Blocker:   Angelica Ljungqvist,   RC Cannes
 Best Setter:  Hélia Souza,  Sirio Perugia
 Best Libero:   Yuko Sano,    RC Cannes

See also
2005–06 CEV Champions League

External links
Official website

CEV Women's Champions League
CEV Women's Champions League
CEV Women's Champions League